The 2016–17 NBB season was the 9th season of the Novo Basquete Brasil, the Brazilian basketball league. Once again this tournament was organized entirely by the Liga Nacional de Basquete (LNB). The NBB also qualified teams for international tournaments such as Liga Sudamericana and FIBA Americas League.

This season fifteen teams played each other in the regular season. At the end of the home and away matches round the top four teams qualified for the quarterfinals of the playoffs automatically, while the teams finishing in the 5th and 12th place participated in the first round of the playoffs to determine the other four teams in the quarterfinals, in a five-match series. This season maintained 15/16's playoff method of best of 5 games, played on the 1-2-1-1 format.

For this season, the last two regular season placed teams were relegated to the Liga Ouro, the NBB second division. Only the Liga Ouro winner received the right to contest NBB in the next year.

Participating teams 
New teams in the league
Vasco da Gama (2016 Liga Ouro champions, promoted) 
Campo Mourão Basquete (2016 Liga Ouro runners-up, invited) 

Teams that left the league
São José
Rio Claro Basquete

{| class="wikitable sortable"
! Team
! Home city
! Stadium
! Capacity
! Head coach
! Appearance
! Last regular season
! Last season playoffs
|-
| Solar Basquete Cearense
| Fortaleza
| Ginásio Paulo Sarasate
| 8,200
|  Alberto Bial
| style="text-align: center;"| 5th
| style="text-align: center;"| 4th
| style="text-align: center;"| Quarterfinals
|-
| Gocil/Bauru Basket
| Bauru
| Ginásio Panela de Pressão
| 2,000
|  Demétrius Ferracciú
| style="text-align: center;"| 9th
| style="text-align: center;"| 2nd
| style="text-align: center;"| Runner-up
|-
| Campo Mourão Basquete
| Campo Mourão
| Ginásio de Esportes Belin Carolo
| 3,000
|  Emerson de Souza
| style="text-align: center;"| 1st
| style="text-align: center;"| 2nd (Liga Ouro)
| style="text-align: center;"| -
|-
| UniCEUB/BRB Brasília
| Brasília
| Ginásio da ASCEB
| 3,050
|  Bruno Savignani
| style="text-align: center;"| 9th
| style="text-align: center;"| 6th
| style="text-align: center;"| Semifinals
|-
| Banrisul Caxias do Sul
| Caxias do Sul
| Ginásio Vasco da Gama
| 850
|  Rodrigo Barbosa
| style="text-align: center;"| 2nd
| style="text-align: center;"| 11th 
| style="text-align: center;"| Round of 16
|-
| Flamengo
| Rio de Janeiro
| Ginásio Hélio Maurício Ginásio Álvaro Vieira Lima
| 800 4,500
|  José Alves Neto
| style="text-align: center;"| 9th
| style="text-align: center;"| 1st
| style="text-align: center;"| Champions
|-
| Franca
| Franca
| Ginásio Pedrocão
| 6,000
|  Helinho
| style="text-align: center;"| 9th
| style="text-align: center;"| 8th
| style="text-align: center;"| Round of 16
|-
| Liga Sorocabana
| Sorocaba
| Ginásio Gualberto Moreira
| 3,000
|  Rinaldo Rodrigues
| style="text-align: center;"| 6th
| style="text-align: center;"| 13th
| style="text-align: center;"| DNQ
|-
| Macaé
| Macaé
| Ginásio Juquinha
| 3,000
|  Léo Costa
| style="text-align: center;"| 4th
| style="text-align: center;"| 15th
| style="text-align: center;"| DNQ
|-
| Minas Storm
| Belo Horizonte
| Arena Vivo
| 4,000
|  Cristiano Grama
| style="text-align: center;"| 9th
| style="text-align: center;"| 10th
| style="text-align: center;"| Round of 16
|-
| Mogi das Cruzes/Helbor
| Mogi das Cruzes
| Ginásio Municipal Professor Hugo Ramos
| 5,000
|  Guerrinha
| style="text-align: center;"| 5th
| style="text-align: center;"| 5th
| style="text-align: center;"| Semifinals
|-
| Paulistano/Corpore
| São Paulo
| Ginásio Antônio Prado Junior
| 1,500
|  Gustavo de Conti
| style="text-align: center;"| 9th
| style="text-align: center;"| 3rd
| style="text-align: center;"| Quarterfinals
|-
| Pinheiros
| São Paulo
| Poliesportivo Henrique Villaboim
| 854
|  César Guidetti
| style="text-align: center;"| 9th
| style="text-align: center;"| 7th
| style="text-align: center;"| Quarterfinals
|-
| Vasco da Gama
| Rio de Janeiro
| Ginásio Vasco da Gama
| 1.000
|  Dedé Barbosa
| style="text-align: center;"| 1st
| style="text-align: center;"| 1st (Liga Ouro)
| style="text-align: center;"| -
|-
| Universo Vitória
| Salvador
| Ginásio Poliesportivo de Cajazeiras Fazenda 
| 2.060
|  Régis Marrelli
| style="text-align: center;"| 2nd
| style="text-align: center;"| 12th
| style="text-align: center;"| Round of 16
|-

|}

Transactions

Retirement
 On September 24, 2016, Robert Day retired from basketball after playing 6 seasons in Brazil, reaching the league final on three occasions with São José (12/13) and Bauru Basket (14/15, 15/16), as well as winning NBB's best Small Forward award for the 12/13 season.

Coaching changes

Off-season
 On May 13, 2016, Franca hired Helinho to replace Lula Ferreira, who became the team General Manager after four years working as the team coach.
 On June 10, 2016, Mogi decided not to renew with coach Danilo Padovani, hiring Guerrinha as his replacement.

In-season
There were no coaching changes during the regular season.

Regular season
The regular season began on Saturday, November 5, 2016 at Ginásio Panela de Pressão, home of Gocil/Bauru Basket, who hosted a game against the Flamengo at 14:00 UTC−03:00. The regular season ended on Saturday, April 8, 2017.

Standings

Awards
Most Valuable Player: Desmond Holloway, Pinheiros
Sixth Man of the Year Award: Arthur Pecos, Paulistano/Corpore
Defensive Player of the Year Award: Jimmy de Oliveira, Mogi das Cruzes/Helbor
Most Improved Player of the Year Award: Georginho de Paula, Paulistano/Corpore
NBB Coach of the Year (Ary Vidal Trophy): Gustavo de Conti, Paulistano/Corpore
NBB's Revelation Player of the Year: Alexey Borges, Franca
NBB Finals MVP Award: Alex Garcia, Bauru Basket

Arenas
As both teams played their first NBB season, it was the first appearance of Campo Mourão's Ginásio de Esportes Belin Carolo and Vasco's Ginásio Vasco da Gama.

Identities
 On June 20, 2016, Mogi das Cruzes/Helbor unveiled a new team logo.
 On July 21, 2016, Liga Sorocabana unveiled a new team identity.
 On August 29, 2016, UniCEUB/BRB Brasília unveiled a new rebrand of their logo and mascot.
 On September 2, 2016, Bauru Basket unveiled a new sponsor partnership involving naming rights with Gocil, and so its name changed to Gocil/Bauru Basket. On September 20, 2016 they announced a new team identity and new team colors (green, orange, black and white).
 On September 21, 2016, Banrisul Caxias do Sul unveiled a new team identity.
 On October 7, 2016, Campo Mourão Basquete unveiled a new team identity for their first NBB season.
 On October 28, 2016, Minas Tênis clube unveiled a new team identity and nickname for the season, and so its name changed to Minas Storm.

Notable occurrences

Playoffs 
 This was the first time that no team from the top 4 advanced to the semi-finals.

Playoffs

Final standings
Teams are ranked based on the playoff round in which they were eliminated and their regular season records.

References

2016-17
NBB
Brazil